Chloeria is a genus of skippers in the family Hesperiidae.

Species
Chloeria psittacina

References

Hesperiinae
Hesperiidae genera